Suike was a chieftain of the Wanyan tribe, the most dominant among the Jurchen tribes which later founded the Jin dynasty (1115–1234). He was the eldest son of Bahai.

Suike was posthumously honoured with the temple name Xianzu (獻祖) by his descendant, Emperor Xizong.

Family
 Father: Bahai
 Mother: Bahai's primary consort, posthumously honoured as Empress Jie (節皇后)
 Spouse: Name unknown, posthumously honoured as Empress Gongjing (恭靖皇后)
 Sons:
 Shilu, posthumously honoured as Emperor Zhaozu
 Pudu (朴都)
 Abaohan (阿保寒)
 Diku (敵酷)
 Digunai (敵古乃)
 Salinian (撒里輦)
 Sagezhou (撒葛周)

References
 

Jurchen rulers